Antoni Popławski (1739–1799) was a Polish Piarist educator and economist. A physiocrat and a proponent of the emancipation of serfs, in 1774 he coined the term "noble democracy" to describe the political system of the Polish–Lithuanian Commonwealth. Popławski was born and died in Cracow.

Works
 O rozporzadzeniu i wydoskonaleniu edukacji obywatelskiej (1774) Available on Google Books.
 Moralna nauka dla szkól narodowych (1778)

References

1739 births
1789 deaths
Polish economists
Piarists